Heinz Mäder (born 13 April 1937) is a German former water polo player. He competed in the men's tournament at the 1964 Summer Olympics.

See also
 Germany men's Olympic water polo team records and statistics
 List of men's Olympic water polo tournament goalkeepers

References

External links
 

1937 births
Living people
People from Limbach-Oberfrohna
German male water polo players
Water polo goalkeepers
Olympic water polo players of the United Team of Germany
Water polo players at the 1964 Summer Olympics
Sportspeople from Saxony